Susian may refer to:

 Susians, inhabitants of Susa, an ancient city in the lower Zagros Mountains, Iran
 Susian language, another name for the Elamite language